The men's heptathlon at the 2012 IAAF World Indoor Championships took place March 9 and 10 at the Ataköy Athletics Arena.  8 athletes from 7 countries participated.  American Ashton Eaton won with a world record points total of 6645, breaking his own previous record of 6568.

Medalists

Records

Qualification standards
 the three best athletes from the previous year’s Outdoor Lists (as at 31 December), limited to a maximum of one per country and
 the three best athletes from the Indoor Lists during the year of the Competition
 two athletes which may be invited at the discretion of the IAAF
In total no more than two male and two female athletes from any one Member will be invited.
Upon refusals or cancellations, the invitations shall be extended to the next ranked athletes in the same lists respecting the above conditions.
Members whose athletes are invited as above will receive additional quota places accordingly

Schedule

Results

60 metres

Long jump

Shot put

High jump

60 metres hurdles

Pole vault

1000 metres

Final standings

References

Heptathlon
Combined events at the World Athletics Indoor Championships